Cancriniella is a monotypic genus of flowering plants in the aster family, Asteraceae. It contains only one known species Cancriniella krascheninnikovii, endemic to Kazakhstan.

References

Anthemideae
Monotypic Asteraceae genera
Endemic flora of Kazakhstan